Dan O'Neill or Daniel O'Neill may refer to:

 Dan O'Neill (Gaelic footballer), (1933-2015), Irish Gaelic footballer
 Dan O'Neill (born 1942), American cartoonist
 Dan O'Neill (born 1948), founder of Mercy Corps
 Dan O'Neill (writer) (born 1950), Alaskan journalist and author
 Daniel O'Neill (painter) (1920–1974), Irish Romantic painter
 Daniel O'Neill (Royalist) (c. 1612–1664), Irish army officer, politician and courtier
 Daniel O'Neill (editor) (1830–1877), editor and owner of the Pittsburgh Dispatch newspaper

See also
 Danny O'Neil, American football player